David Andrew Taylor (born December 4, 1955) is a Canadian former professional ice hockey player who played in the National Hockey League (NHL) with the Los Angeles Kings from 1977 to 1994. He featured in the 1993 Stanley Cup Finals with the Kings.

Following his playing career, he served as the Kings' general manager from 1997 to 2006, and currently serves as Vice-president of Hockey Operations with the NHL's St. Louis Blues.

Early life
Taylor was born and raised in Levack, Ontario, a mining town located 45 km northwest of Sudbury, Ontario. He began playing minor hockey in Levack and became a young prodigy in the small town. In his teens, he attended his local Levack High School while also working in the mine in his hometown.

Junior and college career
Taylor found himself playing Junior A for his hometown Onaping Falls Huskies of the Northern Ontario Junior Hockey League in 1973 where he recorded 67 goals and 76 assist to total 143 points in 45 games.

After one season with Onaping Falls with him graduating from high school. Taylor played three seasons of college hockey at Clarkson University, where he still holds the school record for career points (251) goals (98) and assists (153) as well as single season goals (41) assists (67) and points (108) in the 1976-77 campaign where he led all of NCAA that year and won the ECAC Hockey player of the year award. in comparison, opposing teams scored a combined 127 goals on Clarkson that year.

Taylor also played 7 games with the Fort Worth Texans of the Central Hockey League during the 1976–77 season putting up 2 goals and 4 assists for 6 points.

NHL career
Taylor was selected 210th overall in the 15th round of the 1975 NHL Amateur Draft and was also selected 113th overall in the 9th round of the 1975 WHA Amateur Draft. His first NHL season was the 1977–78 season where he played 64 of 80 games and recorded 22 goals and 21 assists to total 43 points. In the next season of 1978–79, he improved to one of the leagues top scorers recording 43 goals and 48 assists to total 91 points.

Taylor was a member of the famous Triple Crown Line along with hall of fame centre Marcel Dionne and left winger Charlie Simmer. In the 1980–81 season all three scored more than 100 points in the with the Kings with Dionne and Simmer scoring 135 and 105 points, respectively and Taylor scoring 112 points to record the best season of his career.

Taylor became captain of the Kings in 1985 after the departure of preceding captain Terry Ruskowski. He held the position until 1989 when it was overtaken by Wayne Gretzky. He would then serve as an alternate captain for the rest of his career.

In 1991, Taylor won the Bill Masterton Memorial Trophy for his dedication towards the Los Angeles Kings. He also won the King Clancy Memorial Trophy for his involvement in charity work and for helping others overcome speech impediments.

In 1993, with his production rapidly deteriorating, Taylor and the Los Angeles Kings made the Stanley Cup Finals with him producing 3 goals and 5 assists for 8 points in 22 playoff games. The Kings lost to the Montreal Canadiens in the final in 5 games.

Taylor retired in 1994 as he was becoming less active in the NHL and his points were starting to decline. Until 2019, he held the Kings record for games played with 1,111 until it was broken by Dustin Brown and then Anže Kopitar. He is the lowest-drafted player to net 1,000 career points, drafted in the 15th round (210th overall) of the 1975 NHL draft and has appeared in four NHL All-Star Games in 1981, 1982, 1986 and 1994. The Los Angeles Kings have retired #18 in his honor.

International career
Taylor represented Canada in the Ice Hockey World Championships in 1983, 1985 and 1986. During those tournaments, he recorded 7 goals and 10 assists for 17 points in 30 games. Canada won bronze in 1983 and 1986 and also won a silver in 1985.

Front office
Taylor was hired as the General Manager of the Los Angeles Kings in 1997 and held the position until 2006, when a front office reshuffling saw him assume the position of Director of Amateur Development. He also drafted future Kings superstars which include Anže Kopitar, Dustin Brown and Jonathan Quick. With a record of 290-261-74-31, Taylor was the winningest GM in Kings’ history. He later moved to the Dallas Stars and served as the team's Director of Player Personnel for three seasons.

Taylor was hired by the St. Louis Blues on July 1, 2010, as Vice-president of Hockey Operations. He won the Stanley Cup with the Blues in 2019 and returned to his hometown of Levack with the cup.

Personal
Because of his success, Taylor is considered a hero in his hometown of Levack and the arena there features a lot of dedication to him.

Taylor has dealt with stuttering since childhood. The speech disorder once forced him to drop a college class when he discovered that an oral presentation would be required. When interviewed after games early in his professional hockey career, Taylor would attempt to conceal his stuttering by faking hyperventilation as a means of providing him with fluency. Taylor credits Los Angeles-based Speech-Language Pathologist Vivian Sheehan for assisting him in his triumph over stuttering.

Taylor and his wife Beth currently reside near Los Angeles with their two daughters, Jamie and Katie.

Career statistics

Regular season and playoffs

International

Awards and honors

See also
List of NHL players with 1000 games played
List of NHL players with 1000 points

References

External links

 	 
 

	 

1955 births
Living people
AHCA Division I men's ice hockey All-Americans
Bill Masterton Memorial Trophy winners
Canadian ice hockey right wingers
Clarkson Golden Knights men's ice hockey players
Dallas Stars executives
Houston Aeros draft picks
Ice hockey people from Ontario
Sportspeople from Greater Sudbury
King Clancy Memorial Trophy winners
Los Angeles Kings draft picks
Los Angeles Kings executives
Los Angeles Kings players
National Hockey League All-Stars
National Hockey League executives
National Hockey League players with retired numbers
St. Louis Blues executives